Ben Amathila (born 1 October 1938 in Walvis Bay) is a retired Namibian politician. Amathila served in the government of Namibia with SWAPO from independence in 1990 until his retirement in April 2007. 

From 1990 to 1993 he served as Minister of Trade and Industry. In 1993 he was moved against his will to the Ministry of Information and Broadcasting and served as minister until 2000. In 2000, president Sam Nujoma dismissed him from his cabinet post. He retained his seat in the National Assembly until his resignation in 2007, citing concerns with his party. Internationally, Amathila is a member of the Pan-African Parliament.

Amathila was re-elected to the SWAPO Central Committee at the party's August 2002 congress, placing eighth with 369 votes, and he was again elected to the Central Committee at SWAPO's November 2007 congress.

Namibian War of Independence 
Amathila began working towards Namibian independence in 1959 with the forerunner to SWAPO, the Ovamboland People's Organization. He helped mobilizing support for SWAPO from 1959 until going into exile in 1966. He then was instrumental in organizing SWAPO's consultative congress at Tanga, Tanzania in 1969. Shortly afterwards, Amathila became SWAPO's representative in Scandinavia then the movement's Secretary for Economics in Lusaka than Luanda.

Personal life
Amathila was educated in Okahandja then Tsumeb. He is married to the first Black Namibian female physician and fellow politician, Libertina Amathila. He is the owner of a farm near Omaruru, where he plans to spend his retirement.

References 

1938 births
Living people
People from Walvis Bay
Ovambo people
SWAPO politicians
Trade and industry ministers of Namibia
Information ministers of Namibia
Members of the National Assembly (Namibia)
Members of the Pan-African Parliament from Namibia
Augustineum Secondary School alumni